Joedy Wall is a Canadian politician, who was elected to the Newfoundland and Labrador House of Assembly in the 2021 provincial election. He represents the electoral district of Cape St. Francis as a member of the Newfoundland and Labrador Progressive Conservative Party. Prior to his election, Wall was the Mayor of Pouch Cove.

Wall unsuccessfully ran in the 2019 federal election as the Conservative candidate in St. John's East.

Election results

References

Living people
Progressive Conservative Party of Newfoundland and Labrador MHAs
21st-century Canadian politicians
Year of birth missing (living people)
Newfoundland and Labrador municipal councillors